The ITU-T Recommendation E.212 defines mobile country codes (MCC) as well as mobile network codes (MNC).

Overview
The mobile country code consists of three decimal digits and the mobile network code consists of two or three decimal digits (for example: MNC of 001 is not the same as MNC of 01). The first digit of the mobile country code identifies the geographic region as follows (the digits 1 and 8 are not used):

 0: Test networks
 2: Europe
 3: North America and the Caribbean
 4: Asia and the Middle East
 5: Australia and Oceania
 6: Africa
 7: South and Central America
 9: Worldwide (Satellite, Air—aboard aircraft, Maritime—aboard ships, Antarctica)

An MCC is used in combination with an MNC (a combination known as an "MCC/MNC tuple") to uniquely identify a mobile network operator (carrier) using the GSM (including GSM-R), UMTS, LTE, and 5G public land mobile networks. Some but not all CDMA, iDEN, and satellite mobile networks are identified with an MCC/MNC tuple as well. For WiMAX networks, a globally unique Broadband Operator ID can be derived from the MCC/MNC tuple. TETRA networks use the mobile country code from ITU-T Recommendation E.212 together with a 10-bit binary mobile network code. However, a TETRA network may be assigned an E.212 network code as well. Some network operators do not have their own radio access network at all. These are called mobile virtual network operators (MVNO) and are marked in the tables as such. Note that MVNOs without their own MCC/MNC (that is, they share the MCC/MNC of their host network) are not listed here.

The following tables attempt to provide a complete list of mobile network operators. Country information, including ISO 3166-1 alpha-2 country codes is provided for completeness. Mostly for historical reasons, one E.212 MCC may correspond to multiple ISO country codes (e.g., MCC 362 corresponds to BQ, CW, and SX). Some operators also choose to use an MCC outside the geographic area that it was assigned to (e.g. Digicel uses the Jamaica MCC throughout the Caribbean). ITU-T updates an official list of mobile network codes in its Operational Bulletins which are published twice a month. ITU-T also publishes complete lists: as of January 2019 list issued on 15 December 2018 was current, having all MCC/MNC before 15 December 2018. Unfortunately, the official list is often incomplete as national MNC authorities do not forward changes to the ITU in a timely manner. The official list does not provide additional details such as bands and technologies and may not list disputed territories such as Abkhazia or Kosovo.

Test networks

National operators

International operators

British Indian Ocean Territory (United Kingdom) – IO

See also

 Mobile Network Codes in ITU region 2xx (Europe)
 Mobile Network Codes in ITU region 3xx (North America)
 Mobile Network Codes in ITU region 4xx (Asia)
 Mobile Network Codes in ITU region 5xx (Oceania)
 Mobile Network Codes in ITU region 6xx (Africa)
 Mobile Network Codes in ITU region 7xx (South America)
 List of mobile network operators
 List of UMTS networks
 List of LTE networks
 LTE frequency bands
 List of 5G NR networks
 List of CDMA2000 networks
 List of iDEN networks
 List of WiMAX networks

References

External links
 International Telecommunication Union list of MNCs: Mobile Network Codes (MNC) for the international identification plan for public networks and subscriptions (According to Recommendation ITU-T E.212 (05/2008)) (Position on 15 December 2018)
  GSMA - Network Coverage Maps GSM Association member and roaming information
 MCC-MNC.net - Search Mobile Country Codes (MCC) and Mobile Network Codes (MNC) Complete, searchable list of global MCC and MNC codes
 PrePaidGSM.net - Up to date information on GSM mobile prepaid cards offered, including MCC/MNC information
 Numberingplans.com, International Numbering Plans
 3G Cellular Router manufacturer Proxicast's downloadable list of over 900 worldwide CDMA/GSM/UMTS mobile networks

GSM standard
Lists by country
Telecommunications lists
Country codes
Lists of country codes